The Black Dagger Brotherhood is an ongoing series of paranormal romance books by author J. R. Ward. The series focuses on a society (the "Black Dagger Brotherhood") of vampire warriors who live together and defend their race against de-souled humans called lessers. The first book in the series was published in 2005.

Ward's Fallen Angels series is set in the same universe, and has some overlap in characters, but little overlap in story lines. It takes place earlier than the main series.

Main Series

Main books following the brothers.

 
 Black Dagger Brotherhood, box set: Dark Lover, Lover Eternal, Lover Awakened, Lover Unbound, Lover Revealed, Lover Enshrined (2009)

Spin-Off Series

Black Dagger Legacy Series 

A spin-off series that details the trainees. Runs parallel to the main series.

Prison Camp Series 

A spin-off series that follows the inmates of the glymera's secret and notorious prison camp. Runs parallel to the main series.

{| class="wikitable"
!
!Title
!Date
!ISBN
|-
|1
|The Jackal
| August 2020 
|
|-
|2
|The Wolf
| November 2021
|
|-
|   3 
|  The Viper 
| September 2022
|

The Lair of the Wolven Series 

A spin-off series that follows wolves of the Black Dagger Brotherhood world. Runs parallel to the main series.

Fallen Angels Series 

Series set in the same universe, but takes place in an earlier timeline.

Suggested Reading Order

Reading order suggested by J.R. Ward.

 Dark Lover (BDB Book #1)
 Lover Eternal (BDB Book #2)
 Lover Awakened (BDB Book #3)
 Lover Revealed (BDB Book #4)
 Lover Unbound (BDB Book #5)
 Lover Enshrined (BDB Book #6)
 Lover Avenged (BDB Book #7)
 Lover Mine (BDB Book #8)
 Lover Unleashed (BDB Book #9)
 Lover Reborn (BDB Book #10)
 Lover At Last (BDB Book #11)
 The King (BDB Book #12)
 The Shadows (BDB Book #13)
 Blood Kiss (Legacy Book #1)
 The Beast (BDB Book #14)
 Blood Vow (Legacy Book #2)
 The Chosen (BDB Book #15)
 Blood Fury (Legacy Book #3)
 The Thief (BDB Book #16)
 Prisoner of Night (Novella #1)
 The Savior (BDB Book #17)
 Blood Truth (Legacy Book #4)
 Where Winter Finds You (Novella #2)
 The Sinner (BDB Book #18)
 The Jackal (Prison Camp Book #1)
 A Warm Heart in Winter (Novella #3)
 Lover Unveiled (BDB Book #19)
 Claimed (Wolven Book #1)
 The Wolf (Prison Camp #2)

TBD/Unreleased Books:
 Lover Arisen (BDB Book #20)
 Forever (Wolven Book #2)
 Lassiter (BDB Book #21)

Note: 'Prisoner of Night' is a standalone novella in the same world, but does not cover the Brotherhood. 'Where Winter Finds You' and 'A Warm Winter Heart' novellas cover the Brotherhood.

References

External links 
 J. R. Ward's Official Site
 J.R. Ward's Author Page on Simon & Schuster

Book series introduced in 2005
American vampire novels
Fantasy novel series
Paranormal romance novels
American romance novels